Philistia (Koine Greek (LXX): Γῆ τῶν Φυλιστιείμ, romanized: gê tôn Phulistieìm), also known as the Philistine Pentapolis, was a confederation of cities in the Southwest Levant, which included the cities of Ashdod, Ashkelon, Ekron, Gath, Gaza, and for a time, Jaffa. Scholars believe the Philistines were made up of people of an Aegean background that from roughly 1200 BCE onwards settled in the area and mixed with the local Canaanite population, and came to be known as Peleset, or Philistines. At its maximum territorial expansion, its territory may have stretched along the Canaanite coast from Arish in the Sinai (today's Egypt) to the Yarkon River (today's Tel Aviv), and as far inland as Ekron and Gath. Nebuchadnezzar II invaded Philistia in 604 BC, burned Ashkelon, and incorporated the territory in the Neo-Babylonian Empire; Philistia and its native population the Philistines disappear from the historic record after that year.

History
Ancient Egyptian hieroglyphic records from the New Kingdom period record a group of the Sea Peoples called the pwrꜣsꜣtj, generally transliterated as either Peleset or Pulasti, as invading Egypt in the mid-13th century BC. About a century later, pharaoh Ramesses III boasted of having defeated the Peleset, and allegedly relocated them to the southern abandoned coast of Canaan, recording this victory on a Medinet Habu temple inscription dated to c. 1150 BC. The pwrꜣsꜣtj are generally identified as the Philistines. The Great Harris Papyrus, a chronicle of Ramesses' reign written no later than 1149 BC, also records this Egyptian defeat of the Philistines. Despite Ramesses III's claim, archaeology has not been able to corroborate the existence of any such (re)settlement, and the lack of sense in granting an apparently barbarous invading people an expansive and richly fertile swath of land already under Egyptian control is noted by scholars.

During Iron Age I, the Philistines seem to have had a presence far outside of what was traditionally considered Philistia, as 23 of the 26 Iron Age I sites in the Jezreel Valley, including Tel Megiddo, Tel Yokneam, Tel Qiri, Afula, Tel Qashish, Be'er Tiveon, Hurvat Hazin, Tel Risim, Tel Re'ala, Hurvat Tzror, Tel Sham, Midrakh Oz and Tel Zariq, yielded typical Philistine pottery dating from the 12th-to-10th century BC. However, given the minuscule quantity of said pottery finds, it is likely that even if the Philistines had by-and-large settled in the area, they remained a minority which had assimilated into the native Canaanite population by the 10th century BC.
 
In its historical form, Philistia's northern boundary was the Yarkon River, with the Mediterranean Sea on the west, the Kingdom of Judah at Ziklag to the east, and the Wadi El-Arish to the south. Philistia consisted of the five city-states of the Philistines, known as the Philistine pentapolis, described in the Book of Joshua and the Books of Samuel, comprising Ashkelon, Ashdod, Ekron, Gath, and Gaza, in the south-western Levant. Tell Qasile and Aphek (see Battle of Aphek) likely marked the nation's frontiers, as evidence from Tell Qasile especially indicates that non-Philistines constituted an otherwise unusually large portion of their respective populations. The identity of the aforementioned Ziklag, a city which according to the Bible marked the border between the Philistine and Israelite territory, remains uncertain.

Philistia included Jaffa (in today's Tel Aviv), but it was lost to the Hebrews during Solomon's time. Nonetheless, the Philistine king of Ashkelon conquered Jaffa again circa 730 BC. Following Sennacherib's third campaign in the Levant, the Assyrians re-assigned Jaffa to the Phoenician city-state of Sidon, and Philistia never got it back.

The Five Lords of the Philistines are described in the Hebrew Bible as being in constant struggle and interaction with the neighbouring Israelites, Canaanites and Egyptians, being gradually absorbed into the Canaanite culture.

Philistia was occupied by Tiglath-Pileser III of the Assyrian Empire in the 8th century BC. Throughout the century, often at the incitement of neighboring Egypt, Philistia revolted against Assyrian rule, but each time they were defeated and forced to pay tribute. Gath disappears from history after Sargon II records its capture in 711 BC, which may indicate he destroyed the city rather than conquered it. Interestingly, the term "Philistia" is not used in Assyrian records describing their campaigns, only the names of individual cities, which may indicate that at this stage the Philistines had become increasingly divided and that the confederation of the pentapolis which constituted Philistia had fractured into separate city-states. Sennacherib further reported that he had sacked (and possibly burned) a "royal city of the land Philistia that [Hezek]iah had taken away (and) fortified," but the city's name has not survived. The texts also mention that Ashkelon was also sacked due to its refusal to acknowledge Assyrian authority. Despite this Philistine sedition, Sennacherib records that he divided up the lands he had plundered from Judah amongst the kings of Ashdod, Gaza, and Ekron, even going as far as freeing Padi, the king of Ekron, from Judahite captivity and returning him to the throne.

The Philistines disappear from written records following the conquest of the Levant by the Babylonian king Nebuchadnezzar II during the 6th century BC, when Ashkelon and many other cities from the region were destroyed.

East of Gaza

The area east of Gaza, particularly around Nahal Besor that reaches into the hills as far as Beersheva, had a very substantial Philistine presence. This area is a part of the Negev desert. It also includes Nahal Gerar to the north that joins Nahal Besor before flowing into the Mediterranean Sea.

This was a heavily populated area during the early Iron Age. It includes archaeological sites such as Tell Beit Mirsim, Tel Haror, Tel Sera (Ziklag) along Nahal Gerar, and Tell Jemmeh and Tell el-Far'ah (South) along Nahal Besor. All these sites and others in the area had Philistine settlements.

When the Neo-Assyrian Empire first invaded this area, the Philistine cities were given considerable autonomy in exchange for tribute. But having responded to various revolts, this policy hardened.

Pleshet
Pleshet is the Hebrew name for what might otherwise be called the "land of the Philistines" according to the Hebrew Bible (see Book of Genesis 21:32, Exodus 13:17, 1 Samuel 27:1, Joel 3:4).

The term refers to the coastal region that stretches roughly from Gaza in the south to Ashdod in the north. The five main cities of the Philistines during the time of the Kings of Israel were Gaza, Ashkelon, Ashdod, Ekron, and Gath.

See also
 Achish the king of Gath
 Palistin (or Walistin), a Syro-Hittite kingdom (11th–9th c. BC) in what is now NW Syria and the SE Turkish province of Hatay
 Timeline of the history of the region of Palestine
 Timeline of the name "Palestine"

References

Bibliography

External links
 Strongs Lexicon

 
Ancient Near East
Historical regions in Israel
History of Palestine (region)
 
States and territories established in the 12th century BC
States and territories disestablished in the 8th century BC
Former confederations